Adam Fielding (born 19 March 1993) is an English actor, known for his roles as Kirin Kotecha in the ITV soap opera Emmerdale and Aaron Turner in the Channel 4 drama Ackley Bridge.

Career
Fielding made his television debut in 2014 as Kirin Kotecha in the ITV soap opera Emmerdale, a role which he portrayed until 2016. In 2017, he portrayed the role of Elijah Stubbs in two episodes of the BBC series In the Dark. In 2018, Fielding landed a role in Krypton, followed by the role of Aaron Turner in the Channel 4 drama Ackley Bridge. His character began a relationship with Missy Booth (Poppy Lee Friar), which resulted in the couple going through an abortion and mutually breaking up.

Filmography

References

External links
 

1993 births
English male soap opera actors
Living people
Male actors from Birmingham, West Midlands